Tomaso Anthony Milone (born February 16, 1987) is an American professional baseball pitcher in the Seattle Mariners organization.  He has previously played in MLB for the Washington Nationals, Oakland Athletics, Minnesota Twins, Milwaukee Brewers, New York Mets, Seattle Mariners, Baltimore Orioles, Atlanta Braves, and Toronto Blue Jays. He made his MLB debut in 2011.

Amateur career
Born and raised in Santa Clarita, California, Milone attended Saugus High School, where he was a standout as a pitcher and hitter. Milone won All-State honors twice, and was the Foothill Player of the Year his senior season, in which he hit .474 and threw a perfect game, finishing the year with a 9-2 record and a 1.04 ERA. Milone then attended the University of Southern California, playing for the USC Trojans baseball team and pursued a degree in public policy and development. As a freshman, Milone was named the number two starter in the rotation and went 7-4 with a 4.94 ERA in 16 starts. In his sophomore season, Milone struggled, going 3-7 with a 6.17 ERA. His junior season would prove to be his best, Milone went 6-6 with a 3.51 ERA and was the number one starter in the rotation. In 2007, Milone played collegiate summer baseball in the Cape Cod Baseball League with the Chatham A's, winning the B.F.C. Whitehouse Award, given to the best pitcher in the league, after finishing the summer 6-1 with a 2.92 ERA.

Professional career

Washington Nationals

Milone was drafted by the Washington Nationals in the 10th round of the 2008 Major League Baseball Draft.

Milone made his major league debut on September 3, 2011, against the New York Mets. Milone struck out Angel Pagan of the New York Mets for his first career strikeout. Later in the same game, he hit a three-run home run on the first pitch of his first Major League at bat, becoming the 27th player, and only the eighth pitcher, in major league history to do so.  He left the game after pitching four and one-third innings.

Oakland Athletics

On December 23, 2011, Milone was traded with A. J. Cole, Derek Norris and Brad Peacock to the Oakland Athletics for Gio González and Robert Gilliam.

Milone started the regular season in the third starting rotation spot behind Brandon McCarthy and Bartolo Colón. Milone was the only starting pitcher in the A's rotation to last all season without getting injured and had started the most games for the A's during the 2012 season. He pitched his first complete game of his career on June 20 defeating the Los Angeles Dodgers. Milone had started game 2 of the ALDS, but the A's had lost to a no decision in the bottom of the 9th inning. Milone finished the season with a 13–10 record and with 137 strikeouts and an ERA of 3.74

Milone was optioned to the Triple-A Sacramento River Cats on August 3, 2013. Milone finished the season with 12 wins in 28 games, 26 of them starts.

Milone started the 2014 season in the A's rotation as the fifth starter. Despite owning a record of 6-3 and a 3.55 ERA in 16 starts, Milone was sent down to AAA. After his demotion he demanded a trade.

Minnesota Twins

On July 31, 2014, the Athletics traded Milone to the Minnesota Twins in exchange for outfielder Sam Fuld. Milone started in five games for the Twins before being shut down with a neck injury.

Milone had a bounce back season in 2015 going 9-5 with a 3.92 ERA in 128.2 innings. Milone struggled in 2016 going 3–5 with a 5.12 ERA and after the season he declined being outrighted to Triple-A Rochester by electing free agency.

Milwaukee Brewers
On December 14, 2016, Milone signed a one-year, $1.25 million contract with the Milwaukee Brewers. He was designated for assignment on May 1, 2017, when the team purchased the contract of Rob Scahill. With the Brewers he was 1-0 with a 6.43 ERA.

New York Mets

On May 7, 2017, the New York Mets claimed Milone off waivers. With the Mets, he was 0-3 with a 8.56 ERA. In 2017 between the two teams, right-handed batters had a higher batting average against him, .348, than against all other MLB pitchers in 30 or more innings.

Second stint in Washington
On December 20, 2017, the Washington Nationals signed Milone to a minor league contract, with an invite to spring training. On July 26, 2018, he was called up in place of Stephen Strasburg in the rotation. Milone was reassigned to the bullpen on August 18. On September 4, Milone was outrighted off the roster. For the season he was 1-1 with a 5.81 ERA. He declared free agency on October 2, 2018.

Seattle Mariners
On December 6, 2018, Milone signed a minor league deal with the Seattle Mariners. He opened the 2019 season with the Tacoma Rainiers. On May 21, his contract was selected by the Mariners.

Baltimore Orioles
Milone signed a minor league deal with the Baltimore Orioles on February 13, 2020.

On July 15, 2020, the Orioles purchased his contract, putting him on the 40-man roster for the shortened season. On July 21, 2020, Milone was named starter for opening day vs the Red Sox as John Means had arm fatigue. On July 24, 2020, he made his Orioles debut as a Opening Day starting pitcher throwing 4 runs on 4 hits and 3 walks in 3 innings pitched against the Boston Red Sox.

Atlanta Braves
On August 30, 2020, Milone was traded to the Atlanta Braves in exchange for AJ Graffanino and Greg Cullen. The Braves released Milone on September 30, 2020, right before their Wild Card Series game against the Cincinnati Reds. In three starts with the Braves, he went 0-0 with a 14.90 ERA.

Toronto Blue Jays 
On February 25, 2021, the Toronto Blue Jays signed Milone to a minor league deal with an invitation to spring training. On April 4, 2021, the Blue Jays selected his contract and placed him on the active roster. On May 27, Milone was placed on the 60-day injured list with left shoulder inflammation. On August 11, 2021, Milone was released by the Blue Jays.

Cincinnati Reds
On August 24, 2021, Milone signed a minor league deal with the Cincinnati Reds. He was assigned to the Triple-A Louisville Bats. Milone made 3 starts for Louisville, going 0-2 with a 14.40 ERA and 10 strikeouts. On October 11, Milone elected free agency.

Seattle Mariners (second stint) 
On April 1, 2022, Milone signed a minor league deal with the Seattle Mariners. He was assigned to the Triple-A Tacoma Rainiers to start the 2022 season. On June 18, he was selected to the major league roster. He was released on August 2, 2022. He resigned a minor league deal on August 19, 2022. He elected free agency on November 10, 2022. On December 15, Milone resigned a minor league deal.

Pitching Repertoire
Milone's four-seam fastball ranges from 85–87 mph, and he complements it with a cutter at the same speed, a  curveball (75–79), and changeup (79–81), as well as a rare two-seam fastball. Milone's repertoire against left-handed hitters tends to be fastball-cutter-curveball, while against right-handers it is fastball-changeup-cutter. He uses his changeup heavily in 2-strike counts against righties. His curve is his best swing-and-miss pitch with a whiff rate of about 33%. Milone has shown good control early in his career, with a walk rate under 2 per 9 innings.

Personal life
Milone married Tina Sarnecki. They welcomed their first child, daughter Mia, in July 2016.

See also

List of Major League Baseball players with a home run in their first major league at bat

References

External links

USC Trojans bio 

1987 births
Living people
American people of Italian descent
Atlanta Braves players
Baltimore Orioles players
Baseball players from California
Binghamton Rumble Ponies players
Buffalo Bisons (minor league) players
Chatham Anglers players
Hagerstown Suns players
Harrisburg Senators players
Oakland Athletics players
Major League Baseball pitchers
Milwaukee Brewers players
Minnesota Twins players
New York Mets players
People from Saugus, Santa Clarita, California
Potomac Nationals players
Rochester Red Wings players
Sacramento River Cats players
Seattle Mariners players
Syracuse Chiefs players
Tacoma Rainiers players
Toronto Blue Jays players
USC Trojans baseball players
Vermont Lake Monsters players
Washington Nationals players